SF Masterworks is a series of science fiction novel reprints published by UK-based company Orion Publishing Group, a subsidiary of Hachette UK. The series is intended for the United Kingdom and Australian markets, but many editions are distributed to the United States and Canada by Hachette Book Group. , there are 188 unique titles in the series, 186 of which have been printed in the relaunched series. Approximately 230 volumes, including hardcover and revised editions, have been published in total.

Superseding the earlier series Gollancz Classic SF (1986–1987) and VGSF Classics (1988–1990), the SF Masterworks series began publication in 1999. Developed to feature important and out of print science fiction novels, the selections were described by science fiction author Iain M. Banks as "amazing" and "genuinely the best novels from sixty years of SF". Many of the selections had been out of print in the United Kingdom for many years.

Its companion series include Fantasy Masterworks and Gateway Essentials.

Numbered series

Softcover editions (1999–2007)

Hardcover editions (2001) 
Not all printings include a volume number stamp. Printings distributed to the United States do not include any markings to indicate they are part of a series.

Relaunch series

Softcover editions (2010–present) 
The new designs sport yellow/white spines, with the SF Masterworks logo written vertically on the cover. The original 10 numbered titles were re-issued first. For titles that were previously issued in the original series, generally the cover artwork is tinted in a different colour from the original version. For example, The Dispossessed cover artwork is primarily red in the original release, and was tinted green when reprinted as part of the relaunch.

Only two titles from the numbered series have not yet been reprinted in the relaunch series: The Drowned World and Now Wait for Last Year. Since these are also the only entries missing from the "Complete List" of titles published by Gollancz in 2016, the delay in reprinting both titles is likely a publisher oversight.

"Rounded Corner" paperbacks

Hardcover editions (2010–2017) 

‡ Reprinted version of a title from the numbered series

§ Later reprinted in a paperback edition

Forthcoming

Unpublished editions 
The following editions were announced, but appear to have been withdrawn:

The Best of the SF Masterworks collection

Softcover (2022 - present)

Hardcover edition (2022 - present)

Related series

Gollancz 50th Anniversary (2011) 
To celebrate the 50th anniversary of the Gollancz imprint, Orion published ten fan-chosen editions. Each novel featured Gollancz's red-on-yellow cover design. The series was initially marketed as part the SF Masterworks series.

Golden Age Masterworks (2019–present) 
Initially marketed as part the SF Masterworks series.

Rounded-corner paperbacks (2006) 
A collection of 10 SF masterworks was published in 2006 in a distinctive paperback edition with matte, non-glossy covers, rounded corners and minimialist cover art by Marc Adams.

See also 
 Fantasy Masterworks

References

External links 
 
 
 
 
 SF Masterworks at LibraryThing
 SF Masterworks at Worlds Without End

Lists of books
Science fiction book series
Science fiction lists